The Manse is a historic church manse in Northampton, Massachusetts.  With a construction history dating to 1744, it is in part a good example of vernacular mid-18th century architecture.  It has also had a procession of locally notable owners and residents.  The house was listed on the National Register of Historic Places in 1976.

Description and history
The Manse is located in a residential area north of downtown Northampton, on the west side of Prospect Street at its junction with Trumbull Road.  It is a two-story wood-frame structure, with a gambrel style roof and twin interior chimneys.  Three dormers pierce the steep slope of the gambrel, the center one with a rounded arch roof, the outer two with hip roofs.  A square cupola rises at the center of the roof.  A -story ell, the oldest part of the building, extends to the rear.

The property's history begins in the 17th century, when it was part of a land grant to Reverend Solomon Stoddard, whose parsonage was built here in 1684.  Stoddard was the pastor of the first church in Northampton and the grandfather of Jonathan Edwards, a leading force in the First Great Awakening who briefly lived in that house.  In 1744, Stoddard's son John built what is now the rear ell as a replacement for that house.  John Stoddard was active in a civic affairs, serving in the provincial militia and the provincial legislature.  His son, also named Solomon, built the front portion of the house in 1782; he served as sheriff of Hampshire County.  Other notable residents include Josiah G. Holland, writer and founder of Scribner's Monthly, and Dr. Benjamin Barrett, a prominent local politician.  The house was purchased in 1940 by Dorothy Douglas, a professor at Smith College, who oversaw its restoration.  She also commissioned a series of murals that now adorn its walls; these were executed by Oliver Larkin.

See also
National Register of Historic Places listings in Hampshire County, Massachusetts

References

Houses completed in 1744
Buildings and structures in Northampton, Massachusetts
Houses on the National Register of Historic Places in Massachusetts
National Register of Historic Places in Hampshire County, Massachusetts
Houses in Hampshire County, Massachusetts
1744 establishments in the Thirteen Colonies